Ojala (Spanish: Ojalá) is an unincorporated community in Ventura County, California, United States. Ojala sits at the foot of Nordhoff Ridge in Los Padres National Forest. Ojala was once served by the smallest post office in the United States, which was the size of a phone booth. It can still be visited in neighboring Wheeler Springs, CA. Ojala was one of the first tourist attractions by Ojai Valley, primarily due to its natural hot springs.

Ojala is Spanish and translates into "hopefully" or an expression of hope. The community of about 8 houses can only be reached by a single road.

See also
 Matilija Dam

References

Unincorporated communities in Ventura County, California
Ojai, California
Unincorporated communities in California